Marjuca or Death (Marjuča ili smrt) is a 1987 Croatian film directed by Vanča Kljaković.

Cast

Mirjana Karanović

External links
 

1987 films
Croatian romantic drama films
1980s Croatian-language films
Films about adolescence
Yugoslav romantic drama films